Aleksandr Anatolyevich Babanov (born 9 May 1958) is a Russian professional football coach and a former player.

External links
 

1958 births
Footballers from Voronezh
Living people
Soviet footballers
Association football midfielders
Russian footballers
FC Lada-Tolyatti players
PFC Krylia Sovetov Samara players
FC Baltika Kaliningrad players
Russian football managers
FC Lada-Tolyatti managers